Dominik Kocsis (born 1 August 2002) is a Hungarian professional footballer who plays as a winger for Nemzeti Bajnokság I club Budapest Honvéd.

Club career
On 19 August 2021, Kocsis joined Diósgyőr on a season-long loan.

Career statistics
.

References

External links

2002 births
Living people
People from Nagykanizsa
Hungarian footballers
Association football wingers
Budapest Honvéd FC players
Diósgyőri VTK players
Nemzeti Bajnokság I players
Nemzeti Bajnokság II players
Sportspeople from Zala County
Hungary under-21 international footballers